Hunter Zolomon, otherwise known as Zoom and the Reverse-Flash, is a supervillain appearing in American comic books published by DC Comics. The second character to assume the "Reverse-Flash" mantle, he serves as the archnemesis of Wally West and an enemy of Barry Allen.

Zoom appeared in the live-action television series The Flash, portrayed by Teddy Sears.

In 2009, Zoom was ranked as IGN's 37th Greatest Comic Book Villain of All Time.

Publication history
Created by Geoff Johns and Scott Kolins, Hunter Zolomon made his debut in The Flash: Secret Files & Origins #3 in November 2001. He first appeared as Zoom in The Flash (vol. 2) #197 in June 2003.

Fictional character biography

Origin and transformation into Zoom

Hunter Zolomon had a troubled relationship with his parents who rarely spoke to each other or to him. On the day Hunter was to leave for college, his father was revealed to be a serial killer who had murdered six young girls and his mother before being gunned down by the police after refusing to surrender. Following this incident, Hunter became obsessed with understanding the criminal mind and went on to study criminology and psychology at college. He later joined the Federal Bureau of Investigation (F.B.I.) with his girlfriend Ashley whom he soon married. The two specialized in apprehending low-level costumed criminals until Hunter inadvertently caused the death of Ashley's father; Hunter had mistakenly believed that a criminal they were after, the Clown, was incapable of using a gun. The case also left him with a damaged knee, forcing him to use a cane to walk. Abandoned by Ashley and fired by the F.B.I., Hunter moved to Keystone City and became a profiler in the police's Department of Metahuman Hostilities. Hunter soon befriended the Flash (Wally West) as his insight was critical in solving a number of cases, though Hunter resented being stuck behind a desk.

Hunter was severely injured during an attack by Gorilla Grodd at Iron Heights Penitentiary, and was left paralysed from the waist down. He begged Wally to use the time-travelling cosmic treadmill in the Flash Museum to prevent the series of tragedies in his life from ever occurring. But Wally refused, not wanting to risk damaging the timestream and thus shattering their friendship. Hunter then broke into the museum and attempted to use the cosmic treadmill himself. The resulting explosion cured Hunter's paralysis and shifted his connection to time; he now had the ability to alter his personal timeframe, granting him super-speed.

Hunter came to the conclusion that Wally's refusal to help was because of never suffering a personal tragedy unlike Barry Allen. Hunter became the supervillain "Zoom" (aka the second "Reverse-Flash") to bring tragedy to Wally's life, believing that this was the only way to make the Flash a better hero. During an attempt to kill the pregnant Linda Park, Zoom created an electrical shockwave that caused Linda to miscarry their twins instead. Wally then forced Zoom into a temporal anomaly; Hunter was rendered comatose and forced to relive his father-in-law's death repeatedly.

Zolomon's estranged wife Ashley replaced him as a profiler in the police department and attempted to communicate with him. When Ashley was hospitalized after a car accident, Zoom awakened from his coma out of concern.

Rogue War
Zoom is freed from imprisonment by Cheetah (Dr. Barbara Minerva), seeking to recruit him into the growing Secret Society of Super Villains. Although the two share a minor attraction and romance, Zoom still considers himself married to Ashley.

Zoom infiltrates the Rogue war between Captain Cold's Rogues, the Trickster's reformed Rogues, and the Top's brainwashed Rogues. After spiriting Ashley out of danger to Linda's home, Zoom returns to the battlefront to dispatch Captain Cold whom he believes is wasting the Flash's time. As Wally and Kid Flash (Bart Allen) attempt to contain the battle, Zoom threatens to snap Bart's neck in a manner reminiscent of what Barry had done to Eobard Thawne (Professor Zoom aka the original Reverse-Flash). Before Zoom can kill Kid Flash, however, Thawne arrives on a cosmic treadmill with Jay Garrick chained to the front end.

A battle ensues between the three Flashes and the two Zooms. Zolomon and Thawne capture Wally and jump onto the treadmill. Hunter then forces Wally to repeatedly experience their first fight in which Linda was severely injured, feeling that West should be made to focus on feelings of sorrow and loss to become a better hero. However, Barry arrives on his own cosmic treadmill in search of Thawne. Barry subsequently saves Wally and returns Thawne to the predecessor's proper place in the timeline. The enraged Zoom then begins running around the world, building up speed to collide with and kill Linda. Wally catches up with Zoom and pushes him, causing the villain to fall forward into the sonic boom that he himself used to kill Linda's twins, thus creating a "fissure in time" that restores Linda's pregnancy. Wally grabs Zoom and uses the treadmill to return to the present. Zoom recognises his mistreatment of Wally and briefly apologizes before slipping into the timestream. He is later seen as a ghostly figure apologizing to Ashley.

Zoom returns during the Infinite Crisis event as the Secret Society of Super Villains' chief speedster. He serves as a member of the Society's strike force, scarring Damage with super-speed punches and massacring the Freedom Fighters.

One Year Later

Zoom later appears at the sacking of Rome; it is unknown whether he travelled to this time period himself, or if he became stranded there after his last encounter with Wally. Zoom is asked by Bart's grandmother to help protect Bart from a tragedy plotted by the villain Inertia. He is also pursued by the Justice League who seek to locate Sinestro after Batman and Green Lantern learn of the Sinestro Corps' existence. Zoom is chased by the Justice Society of America to Atlanta. Damage, seeking revenge on Zoom, takes the villain hostage during a scuffle until being talked down by Liberty Belle. Disappointed that Damage is not "improving", Zoom throws a sharp pipe to kill Damage. Liberty Belle uses super-speed to catch it and toss it back, knocking Zoom unconscious. Zoom later becomes a member of Libra's Secret Society of Super Villains.

Final Crisis

In Final Crisis: Rogues' Revenge, Zoom frees Inertia from the paralysis inflicted by Wally, hoping to make an apprentice out of Inertia by teaching how to "improve" both his own life and the lives of others by inflicting tragedies. Kid Zoom learns this lesson too well and ultimately betrays the Flash's Rogues and Zoom himself, revealing his own desire to make the heroes suffer whereas Zoom wanted them to work through their pain. Inertia then uses his mentor's own timestream manipulation powers against him, unravelling Zoom's timeline and reverting him to the crippled, powerless Zolomon.

The Flash: Rebirth

Hunter makes a cameo in The Flash: Rebirth when he approaches the resurrected and imprisoned Thawne at Iron Heights Penitentiary, stating that they can help each other to be better.

DC Rebirth
In the DC Rebirth relaunch, when Iris West seemingly kills Eobard in the 25th Century, a cloaked figure sends the Renegades back in time to arrest Iris. The hooded man is then revealed to be Zolomon proclaiming that the only way to make the Flashes better heroes is to pit them in a war where they'll experience tragedy. Zolomon muses that he sees Wally as the 'true' Flash, reflecting that Barry's ability to accept death is the crucial difference between Barry and Wally as the Flash (feeling that Wally goes into situations determined to survive) and musing that this difference is how he'll provoke his planned war.

It is later revealed that Thawne brought Zolomon into the twenty-fifth century as part of Zolomon's prior suggestion in Flash: Rebirth that they could help each other be better, the two manipulating the Renegades and agreeing on the need for the Flashes to take a different approach, but they soon parted ways because Thawne felt that, in the end, Zolomon still had faith that the Flashes could be what he imagined them to be whereas Thawne had given up on that idea. After Thawne's 'death', Zolomon finally concedes to Thawne's ideas, returning to his appearance as Zoom and proclaiming that he will provoke the Flashes to war if they will not cooperate with his vision themselves. He subsequently draws Wally to him, claiming that he has lost his powers and regained his sanity, and provokes Wally's memories of lost children, convincing Wally that the Speed Force must be sacrificed to release the other speedsters- including the Flash's children, Impulse and Max Mercury- who are trapped within it, provoking Barry and Wally to war against each other due to their conflicting views on Hunter's 'advice'. The situation escalates when Barry and Wally's conflict breaks the Speed Force, allowing Hunter to draw on the energies of other forces- including what he terms the Strength Force and the Sage Force, enhancing his physical strength and knowledge- but when he tries to use these powers to set history to his own design, he is pursued by the Flashes and lost when he breaks the Speed Force, leaving his location unknown and rendering time travel impossible for the Flashes and any other heroes or villains.

Death to the Speed Force
After he massacred all the Flashes in the multiverse and terrorized Gorilla City, he began searching for the Still Force user. After stealing the Still Force, Hunter reveals to Barry that the combined forces create an entirely new one called the Forever Force, allowing him to see all of time and space. Barry gives chase, along with the Black Flash hot on their trail, intent on purging the other Forces from the Speed Force. Hunter proclaims his goal is to kill the Black Flash, as he says it's his destiny to kill "death itself" after all the tragedies in his life. Barry then shows Hunter a memory fragment in the Forever Force, explaining he investigated Hunter's case on Ashley's father, discovering that Thawne played a part in the murder by giving the Clown a gun before the final confrontation. Distraught by this revelation, Hunter starts to slow his pace. Hunter is reminded that he broke the Force barrier by using Barry and Wally, so they also must find a way to repair the barrier in order to return and solve the mystery of Thawne's involvement. Hunter feels remorse for all the tragedy he inflicted on Wally, his best friend, and against Barry's pleas, resigns to fix the barrier by sacrificing himself as the Flash for atonement, due to him currently wielding the power of all four Forces. He expresses a wish that things could have been different, but then remarks that saving the day is what Flashes do. After telling Barry to tell Wally that he wishes the two could have remained friends, his plan works and the Black Flash is also banished to the Forever Force.

Powers and abilities
While most speedsters in the DC Universe draw their powers from the Speed Force, Hunter Zolomon has the ability to alter time relative to himself, manipulating the speed at which time flows around him. With every step he takes, he uses time travel to control his personal timeline; he slows it down to move faster and speeds it up to move slower, effectively allowing Hunter to run at "superhuman speeds". He can also create powerful sonic booms and electrical shockwaves by snapping his fingers, and is able to grant a form of "super-speed" to other beings by giving them the ability to control their relative timelines through himself; a connection that Zoom can shut down at will. Due to his slowed perception of time, Zolomon's strength and physical attributes have been heightened to superhuman levels, allowing him to effortlessly react to danger and be able to withstand punches from speedsters while sustaining no serious injuries. The temporal nature of Zoom's powers renders him unaffected by the usual problems and hindrances encountered by other speedsters, such as friction and perception when moving at heightened velocities.

Hunter possesses a keen mind, as he was once an investigator specialising in the study of criminology and psychology. Zolomon is also an expert in many forms of hand-to-hand combat, including the martial arts form Taekwondo, and an avid cross country runner and jogger even prior to gaining metahuman powers.

In other media

Television

Hunter Zolomon / Zoom appears in series set in the Arrowverse, portrayed by Teddy Sears while Tony Todd provides the character's disguised voice. Additionally, Ryan Handley portrays Zoom's initial portrayal, and Octavian Kaul portrays Zolomon as a child in flashbacks. This version is a speedster from Earth-2 who produces blue lightning while running and wears an all-black leather bodysuit with clawed gloves and a demonic mask resembling a face restraint. As a child, Zolomon was forced to watch his father murder his mother, which resulted in him becoming a serial killer as an adult before being captured and sent to a mental asylum. When Harry Wells's particle accelerator exploded as Zolomon was being electrocuted, the dark matter released gave him super-speed. Adopting the supervillain moniker Zoom, he used his powers to subjugate Earth-2 and further augmented his connection to the Speed Force by creating various "Velocity" serums. While he became fast enough to travel through time and cross parallel universes, Zolomon was slowly dying due to overuse of the serum, forcing him to siphon other speedsters' energy to survive. After capturing the Flash of Earth-3, Jay Garrick, Zolomon decided to publicly act as the Flash of Earth-2 to give its people a false sense of hope.
 First appearing in season two of The Flash, Zolomon ends up on Earth-1 and passes himself off as "Jay Garrick" to the Flash of Earth-1, Barry Allen, and ostensibly became his ally while secretly sending numerous Earth-2 metahumans to challenge Allen and push him to become faster. To avoid suspicion, Zolomon uses a time-remnant copy of himself to ensure that Zoom and "Jay" are always seen in two different places at the same time. However, his budding romance with Caitlin Snow forces him to reveal his non-metahuman Earth-1 doppelgänger (also portrayed by Sears), which leads to Team Flash deducing his identity. After curing himself of his affliction and killing Allen's father Henry Allen, Zoom attempts to destroy the multiverse except for Earth-1, but Barry thwarts his plans, allowing Time Wraiths to transform Zoom into the Grim Reaper-esque Black Flash before dragging him out of reality for corrupting the Speed Force. In season three, the Black Flash hunts down Savitar, but Killer Frost freezes and shatters the former. Zoom also makes a cameo appearance in the season five episode "What's Past is Prologue".
 Zolomon as the Black Flash also appears in season two of Legends of Tomorrow. Able to sense active speedsters, he pursues a time-aberration of Eobard Thawne / Reverse-Flash, and eventually manages to erase his target from existence.

Video games
 Zoom appears as a boss in Justice League Heroes: The Flash.
 Zoom appears in DC Universe Online, voiced by Robert Dieke.
 The Arrowverse version of Zoom appears in Lego DC Super-Villains, as part of the "DC TV Super-Villains" DLC pack.

Merchandise
 Funko has released two POP! vinyl figures of Hunter Zolomon in The Flash television series tie-in toyline. The first is a regular version of him as Zoom and the second is a "Legion of Collectors" exclusive of him impersonating Jay Garrick.
 DC Collectibles has released a 7-inch Zoom figure based on his Arrowverse appearance.

References

External links
 Zoom at the DC Database
 Zoom at dccomics.com

DC Comics supervillains
Characters created by Geoff Johns
Characters created by Scott Kolins
Comics characters introduced in 2001
DC Comics characters who can move at superhuman speeds
DC Comics characters with accelerated healing
DC Comics characters with superhuman strength
DC Comics metahumans
DC Comics television characters 
Fictional characters who can manipulate sound
Fictional characters who can manipulate time
Fictional characters with electric or magnetic abilities
Fictional criminologists
Fictional Federal Bureau of Investigation personnel
Fictional mass murderers
Fictional psychologists
Fictional serial killers 
Time travelers
Flash (comics) characters